The H. Saunders Grocery and Liquor Store, or sometimes called Victoria Paper Box Building, is an historic building in Victoria, British Columbia, Canada.

See also
 List of historic places in Victoria, British Columbia

References

External links
 

1890 establishments in British Columbia
Buildings and structures in Victoria, British Columbia
Commercial buildings completed in 1890